Bounty Hamster is a 2003 British-New Zealand comic science fiction animated series created by David Max Freedman and Alan Gilbey.

Plot
Cassie Harrison, a 13-year-old girl, is searching the universe for her father after he was kidnapped by space pirates. To help her, she enlists the aid of the only bounty hunter she can afford, a talking blue hamster named Marion. They have an odd-couple style relationship and search the universe together for Cassie's father.

The blue space ship the pair use is divided into two parts, a driving cockpit which can be detached in order to fly down to a planet in a similar manner to a jolly boat from a vessel, and a larger booster component which is attached on top of the small driving compartment. Scenes involving driving often show large objects and rooms that appear within the ship. The name of the ship is Keith.

Running gags include Marion pulling many, or odd, objects from his cheeks as if they are large pockets. In one instance he pulls out a large assortment of objects to help him and Cassie when they are falling off a cliff and this includes a cruise ship. Also, one of the science fiction references is the gag in which C-3PO from Star Wars appears in the ship and Cassie asks who he is.

Every episode starts with a brief explanation of the basic running plot and features a sequence showing Cassie's father being taken away. This is followed by a short sequence showing Marion being uncovered from a 'tough' armoured outfit and standing on stilts. The next sequence features the screen divided into four quarters, each showing several different scenes from episodes. The credits culminate in Marion uttering a fierce growl. The closing credits show an image of stars in space. The tune to the theme sounds like the words 'bounty hamster' but with notes to a 3-4 beat.

Despite airing in a children's timeslot, the show has quite a broad appeal, containing frequent science fiction references, in-jokes and puns, as well as nods to other movies and TV series. Marion's name and eyepatch is a parody of John Wayne and the character he played in True Grit. The show's premise is also based on True Grit – a young girl loses her father and then hires a bounty hunter.

Characters
Marion, the hamster (voiced by Alan Marriott) – Marion is a  blue talking hamster. He wears an eyepatch on his right eye (Which is purely for aesthetic, as he has both eyes) and can fit all manner of objects within his cheek cavities. He is often outraged by stronger characters calling him 'cute' and tries to defend his personality despite his feminine name and small structure and this is when he says his catchphrase Don't call me CUTE! before going berserk. He is often seen as being clumsy or forgetful with the exception of comedic instances such as when he remembers to use a remote controlled locking device on his space ship.
Cassie Harrison (voiced by Juliet Cowan) – Cassie (short for Cassiopeia) wears a white shirt and green trousers with an oddly shaped waist that opens at the top and then becomes thinner to the belt. These have darker green patches on her knees and pockets on either side. She wears grey shoes with white rubber soles. She has dirty blonde hair and is usually the more rational of the pair. She is constantly searching for her father and complaining at Marion's foolishness.

Episodes

In addition, A.I. (Artificial Idiocy), an episode between The Lost World and Planet of the Japes was originally slated to air as episode 21; but due to budget cuts at CITV, the episode was never made and was replaced by The Trial, a low-budget clip show episode. According to co-creator Alan Gilbey, the episode would have involved a past friend of Marion now hunting the duo down in a starship.

External links

2003 British television series debuts
2003 British television series endings
2000s British animated television series
2000s British children's television series
British children's animated action television series
British children's animated space adventure television series
British children's animated comic science fiction television series
English-language television shows
ITV children's television shows
Fictional bounty hunters
Fictional hamsters
Animated television series about mammals
Cultural depictions of John Wayne